Bracknell Rugby Football Club is an English rugby union team based in Bracknell, Berkshire. The club was established in 1955 and has served the community ever since. Bracknell RFC is known for a friendly welcome and a highly dedicated executive, coaching teams and volunteers. It is always looking for new members, players, coaches and volunteers.

The club runs five senior sides, a ladies team, under-19 and under-17 academy sides and the full range of minis and junior teams.  The senior sides play on Saturday afternoons and train on Tuesday and Thursday evenings. The highly successful juniors usually play Sunday afternoons with training on Wednesday evenings and the minis train and play on Sunday morning. The 1st XV currently play in Regional 1South Central, a level five league in the English rugby union system

Ground
Lily Hill Park is located on the south edge of name-sake Lily Hill Park, off London Road, about 20 minutes walk from Bracknell train station.  Bracknell have played in and around Lily Hill Park since 1958, with the first club house situated in Eastern Road.  In 1972 the site of the original club house was sold and a new club house was built at the present site at London Road, along with additional pitches and changing facilities.  During the 1980s the club house was expanded further, with gym facilities upgraded and improved floodlights installed.

In 2000, after achieving promotion to tier 2, a 250-seat stand was installed, along with a path for spectators besides the pitch.  Current capacity at the club is approximately 1,000 standing, along with 250 in the stand, bringing the total figure to around 1,250.

Honours
1st team:
 Berks/Dorset/Wilts 1 champions (2): 1988–89, 1991–92
 South West 1 East champions (2): 1996–97, 2012–13
 South West 1 champions: 1997–98
 National League 2 South champions: 1998–99
 National 2 champions: 2000–01
 Berkshire Knock Out Cup winners (4): 2006–07, 2008–09, 2009–10, 2013–14

2nd team:
Berks/Bucks & Oxon 1 champions (3): 2014–15, 2015–16, 2017–18

3rd team:
Berks/Bucks & Oxon 1 champions (3): 2006–07, 2010–11, 2012–13
Berks/Bucks & Oxon 3 Runners Up : 2016-17
Berks/Bucks & Oxon 2 Champions: 2017-18

References

External links
 Official website

English rugby union teams
Rugby clubs established in 1955
Sport in Bracknell
1955 establishments in England
Rugby union in Berkshire